The 2007–08 National Basketball League All-Star Game was held at the State Netball Hockey Centre in Melbourne, Victoria on 12 December 2007. The game was broadcast live on Fox Sports in Australia.

The game was won by the Aussie All-Stars, 146 points to the World All-Stars 141. Nathan Jawai of the Cairns Taipans electrified the 3,500 in attendance, scoring  a double-double with 24 points (including several Slam dunks), 12 rebounds, 3 assists, 2 steals and 1 block. He was named as the MVP of the All-Star game. Jawai's Cairns Taipans team-mate Stephen Black top-scored for the Aussie All-Stars with 27 points, while Shawn Redhage led the scoring for the World All-Stars with 23 points.

Line-ups

Aussie All-Stars

Head Coach: Brian Goorjian (Sydney Kings)

Starters

Reserves

World All-Stars

Head Coach: Al Westover (Melbourne Tigers)

Starters

Reserves

Game data

See also
NBL All-Star Game (Australia)
2007–08 NBL season
National Basketball League (Australia)

External links
  Official site of the NBL

References

2007–08
Sports competitions in Melbourne
All-Star Game
2000s in Melbourne